Indonesia–Kazakhstan relations refer to bilateral relations between Indonesia and Kazakhstan. The two countries officially established relations in 1993 and share some similarities; both countries possess abundance of natural resources, have predominantly Muslim populations, ensure harmonious diversity and a commitment to human rights and democracy. Both nations have agreed to increase cooperation in several economic sectors, such as agriculture, industry, pharmaceuticals, petroleum, transportation infrastructure and machinery manufacture. Indonesia has an embassy in Astana, while Kazakhstan has an embassy in Jakarta. Both nations are member of Organisation of Islamic Cooperation.

History
The relations started with Indonesia's recognition of the proclamation of independence of the Republic of Kazakhstan, on December 16, 1991. On June 2, 1993, Indonesia and Kazakhstan officially established diplomatic relations. However, it was not until December 29, 2010 that Indonesia opened their embassy in Astana, reciprocated on April 13, 2012 by the opening of Kazakhstan embassy in Jakarta.

High level visits

Indonesian President Suharto paid a state visit to Almaty in April 1995, which was reciprocated by a state visit from President Nursultan Nazarbayev to Jakarta just over three months later. President Nazarbayev paid a state visit to Jakarta on April 12–14, 2012. Indonesian President Susilo Bambang Yudhoyono reciprocated with a visit to Astana on September 2, 2013.

Trade and investment
According to Indonesian Ministry of Trade, the bilateral trade between Indonesia and Kazakhstan in 2012 reached US$63,156 million, a  90,5% increase compared to 2011 figure of US$33,153 million. The trade balance in 2012 was in favour to Kazakhstan that recorded US$46 million surplus over Indonesia. The two countries will boost investment and trade, specifically in the wheat, cotton and rubber industries, as well as in the production and exploration of oil. One of which, a joint venture to produce tires in Kazakhstan with a value of investment of US$100 million. There is also plan to build Indonesian instant noodle factory in Kazakhstan, since Indonesia is one of the world largest producer and consumer of instant noodle and experienced in this industry, while Kazakhstan is one of the largest wheat producer in the region, which will render the supply and production process more cheap and practical. This is an opportunity for Indonesian instant noodle brands to penetrate Central Asian, Russian, and even European markets. This practice has been done by Indonesian instant noodle brand Indomie that invested in Nigeria.

See also
 Foreign relations of Indonesia
 Foreign relations of Kazakhstan

Notes

External links
Embassy of Indonesia in Astana, Kazakhstan
Embassy of Kazakhstan in Jakarta, Indonesia

Kazakhstan
Bilateral relations of Kazakhstan